Yacin Elmi Bouh is a Djiboutian politician. He was Minister of Finance from 1997 to 2005 and has been Minister of Interior and Decentralization since 22 May 2005.

He was a candidate for the post of Vice-President of the Commission of the African Union in the election held at the summit of the organization on 30 and 31 January 2017 in Addis Ababa.

Early life and education
Bouh was born in the city of Djibouti. He studied primary and secondary schools in Djibouti, culminating in a Higher Leaving Certificate Series B – Economical.

Education
He received his Baccalauréat (A level), with major in Economics at the Djibouti High School in 1982.
He received Law Diploma (1983–1985) at the Law University of Nantes, BA in Public Law (1986) and MA in Public Law (1987).

Training
He developed legal texts at the Institut de l’Administration Publique in Paris between 2 January 1988 and 31 March 1988, and was planning projects and public finances at the University of Pittsburgh between 1 June and 31 August 1990.

References
Décret n°2005-0069/PRE portant nomination des membres du Gouvernement.

External links
 Yacin Elmi's candidacy pamphlet as vice-president of the African Union
 Speech of the candisate of Djibouti for the position of vice-president of the commission of the Adeican Union
Site officiel du ministère de l'intérieur et de la décentralisation de Djibouti
Site Officiel

1962 births
Living people
Government ministers of Djibouti